Om Prakash Verma is an Indian politician and a member of the Sixteenth Legislative Assembly of Uttar Pradesh in India. He represented the Shikohabad constituency of Uttar Pradesh and is a member of the Samajwadi Party political party.

Early life and  education
Om Prakash Verma was born in Firozabad.

Political career
Om Prakash Verma has been a MLA for one term. He represented the Shikohabad constituency and is a member of the Samajwadi Party political party.

Posts held

See also

 Shikohabad (Assembly constituency)
 Sixteenth Legislative Assembly of Uttar Pradesh
 Uttar Pradesh Legislative Assembly

References 

Samajwadi Party politicians
Uttar Pradesh MLAs 2012–2017
People from Firozabad district
1959 births
Living people